Keith and Branch Ford Motors Factory and Showroom, also known as The Old Seed Store, is a historic factory and car dealership building located at Upper Jay, Essex County, New York.  It was built about 1920, and is a three-story, six bay by four bay, stuccoed frame building. It has a nearly flat roof and sits on a poured concrete foundation. It was built to accommodate the partial assembly and local sale of Ford Motor Company's Model T automobiles.

It was added to the National Register of Historic Places in 2013.

References

Commercial buildings on the National Register of Historic Places in New York (state)
Commercial buildings completed in 1920
Buildings and structures in Essex County, New York
National Register of Historic Places in Essex County, New York
Auto dealerships on the National Register of Historic Places
Ford Motor Company facilities
Motor vehicle manufacturing plants on the National Register of Historic Places